The opening ceremony of the 1996 Summer Olympics took place in the evening on Friday, July 19 at the Centennial Olympic Stadium, Atlanta, United States. As mandated by the Olympic Charter, the proceedings combined the formal and ceremonial opening of this international sporting event, including welcoming speeches, hoisting of the flags and the parade of athletes, with an artistic spectacle to showcase the host nation's culture and history.
The Games were officially opened by President of the United States of America Bill Clinton.

The Olympic cauldron was lit by former gold medalist and boxing champion Muhammad Ali. The ceremony featured film composer John Williams, French Canadian singer Celine Dion and American singer Gladys Knight. The ceremony attendance was 85,600.

The ceremony was produced and directed by Don Mischer. It was watched by an estimated 3.5billion viewers worldwide, being the most watched TV event until 2022, when it was dethroned by the state funeral of Queen Elizabeth II.

Dignitaries
The ceremony was attended by many world leaders.

Host nation :
 United States - President Bill Clinton and First Lady Hillary Clinton, President & CEO of ACOG Billy Payne, Former President Jimmy Carter and Former First Lady Rosalynn Carter, civil rights leader Coretta Scott King, actor Bruce Willis and actresses Demi Moore and Jane Fonda, Speaker Newt Gingrich

Foreign dignitaries :
 Canada - Prime Minister Jean Chretien
 Mexico - President Ernesto Zedillo
 Brazil - President Fernando Henrique Cardoso
 Argentina - President Carlos Menem
 Bolivia - President Gonzalo Sanchez de Lozada
 France - President Jacques Chirac
 Belgium - Crown Prince Philippe (representing the King of Belgium)
 Portugal - President Jorge Sampaio
 Namibia - Prime Minister Hage Geingob
 Russia - Prime Minister Viktor Chernomyrdin
 United Kingdom - Princess Anne (representing the Queen of the United Kingdom), Deputy Prime Minister Michael Heseltine
 Italy - Prime Minister Massimo D’Alema
 Lithuania - President Algirdas Brazauskas
 Netherlands - Prime Minister Wim Kok
 Greece - President Konstantinos Stephanopoulos
 Germany - Chancellor Helmut Kohl
 Turkey - Prime Minister Necmettin Erbakan
 South Africa - Deputy President Thabo Mbeki and Zanele Dlamini Mbeki
 Rwanda - President Paul Kagame
 Lebanon - Prime Minister Rafic Hariri
 Australia - Prime Minister Paul Keating
 Philippines - First Lady Amelita Ramos
 Bosnia and Herzegovina - Prime Minister  Hasan Muratović
 Poland - President Aleksander Kwaśniewski
 Finland - President Martti Ahtisaari
 Belarus - President Aleksander Lukashenko
 Monaco - Prince Rainier III
 Luxembourg - Grand Duke Jean
 Norway - Crown Prince Haakon (representing the King of Norway)
 Denmark - Prime Minister Poul Nyrup Rasmussen
 San Marino - Captains Regent Pietro Bugli and Pier Paolo Gasperoni
 Sweden - King Carl XVI Gustaf
 Spain - Crown Prince Felipe and Queen Sofia (representing the King of Spain)
 Dominica - Prime Minister Edison James
 US Virgin Islands - Governor Roy Schneider
 Yugoslavia - President Zoran Lilić
 Saint Kitts and Nevis - Prime Minister Denzil Douglas
 Israel - Prime Minister Benjamin Netanyahu

International organizations:
 United Nations - Secretary-General Boutros Boutros-Ghali
 European Union - Vice President Frans Andriessen
 Organization of American States - Secretary General Cesar Gaviria
 International Olympic Committee - President Juan Antonio Samaranch

Proceedings

Countdown
The ceremony began with a countdown at the screen coming from 22 to 1. Starting at 22, footage from previous games appeared with Atlanta at the end complete with an image of fireworks with numbers between 22 and 1 being from previous games until 0 from the current games.
 22 - 1896 Athens
 21 - 1900 Paris
 20 - 1904 St. Louis
 19 - 1908 London
 18 - 1912 Stockholm
 17 - 1920 Antwerp
 16 - 1924 Paris
 15 - 1928 Amsterdam
 14 - 1932 Los Angeles
 13 - 1936 Berlin
 12 - 1948 London
 11 - 1952 Helsinki
 10 - 1956 Melbourne (Ten)
 9 - 1960 Rome (Nine)
 8 - 1964 Tokyo (Eight)
 7 - 1968 Mexico City (Seven)
 6 - 1972 Munich (Six)
 5 - 1976 Montreal (Five)
 4 - 1980 Moscow (Four)
 3 - 1984 Los Angeles (Three)
 2 - 1988 Seoul (Two)
 1 - 1992 Barcelona (One)
 0 - 1996 Atlanta

The Call to the Nations

The segment began by airing a flashback from the Barcelona 1992 Summer Olympics closing ceremony in August 1992 which showed International Olympic Committee President Juan Antonio Samaranch inviting the athletes to compete in Atlanta before the announcers welcomed the world to the ceremony in French and English.

Allegoric spirits then rose from the northwest corner of the stadium in response to the President's invitation.  Representing the Olympic colors of Red (Americas), Green (Oceania), Black (Africa), Yellow (Asia), and Blue (Europe), they each rose to the beat of their own percussion.  They summoned tribes out to the stadium floor with their own color and the percussion began to mix.  Meanwhile, US Army Paratroopers rappelled down from the stadium roof trailing long colorful papers representing the colors while the tribes formed the Rings of the Olympic flag and the Children of Atlanta, dressed in white, formed the number 100 representing the Centennial of the Olympic Games.

Then the Atlanta Symphony Orchestra, under the direction of famed film composer John Williams - John Williams was not there, the Choir & Orchestra was under the direction of John Shaw, played "Summon the Heroes", which was the official song of the 1996 Olympics.  (This was actually his second piece of music for the Olympics with the first being Olympic Fanfare and Theme from the 1984 games.)  As the song started, the children formed a flying dove, which is a symbol of the Olympic movement as doves symbolize peace.  As the music continued, the five tribes intermingled until there was a huge mixture of humanity at the center of the stadium with the tribes all mingled together as one to symbolize the gathering of nations at the Olympics.

The National Anthem

Following the Call to the Nations, the first official protocol of the ceremony took place.  This called for the head of state to make his or her entrance.  In this case the head of state was Bill Clinton, the 42nd President of the United States.  He was joined by Atlanta Committee for the Olympic Games President Billy Payne and IOC President Juan Antonio Samaranch.  After the presentation of colors, the American flag was raised while the Centennial Olympic choir sung the national anthem, The Star-Spangled Banner.  A fly-by from the USAF Thunderbirds concluded the segment.

Welcome to the World
The Artistic portion of the ceremony began and first up was a rousing number called "Welcome to the World."  This was an over the top number featuring cheerleaders, marching bands, and steppers, as all activities originated in the United States.  They performed a montage of southern culture in the deep south including the college sporting culture as well as performing an all-American party. The audience also participated as they performed the wave.  Assisting the cast were chromed Chevrolet pick-up trucks a nod the U.S. auto industry with spotlights in the beds. The segment ends with a fireworks display.

Georgia on My Mind
Gladys Knight sang "Georgia on My Mind", Georgia's official state song, at the opening ceremony.

Summertime
This was the longest artistic segment of the ceremony.  Entitled "Summertime: The Beauty of the South," the focus was on Atlanta and the Old South with a placement on its beauty, spirit, music, history, culture, and rebirth after the American Civil War. During the segment, James Earl Jones quotes famous American writers Zora Neale Hurston, William Faulkner, Mark Twain, and Thomas Rorke.

The segment began with two people each dressed in large butterfly type wingspans. One butterfly as the Moon and the other as the Sun on opposite ends of the stadium. They meet in the center and create the "American Southern Spirit" The American Southern Spirit is a female operatic singer dressed all in white with large butterfly wingspans. The southern spirit butterfly along with other performers dressed as butterflies and fireflies dance to southern music. They welcome the spring with Jazz and Gospel music. Songs include Ol' Man River, Skip to My Lou and When the Saints Go Marching In.  This was meant to represent the American south during the antebellum period of American history.

During the celebration a large mechanical thunderbird appears from the north end of the stadium and engulfs all the butterflies and fireflies on the stadium floor with a large grey cover. The large creature represents the American civil war and the damage caused to the city, the American south and the nation as a whole. The performers and the southern spirit butterfly are left ravaged, in shock and saddened. The southern spirit butterfly is devastated but she slowly brings the other butterflies and creatures back to life with her operatic voice. She re-awakens the creatures. Fifty southern spirit dressed butterflies re-appear and are all dressed with a multi colored wingspan. They represent a new and reborn south. The entire stadium is relit with colored flash lights provided to the audience and the music begins to play Alleluyah, Glory, Glory (Lay My Burden Down) in gospel music and a reprisal of When the Saints Go Marching In. The Atlanta Symphony Orchestra and the Atlanta Centennial Choir (Atlanta Symphony Orchestra Chorus, Morehouse College Glee Club & Spelman College Glee Club) performed all the music. The segment ends with a large fireworks display.

Temple of Zeus
The stadium is then darkened and a temple is produced at the center of the stadium.  This represents the ancient Greek Olympics.  This is a large temple dedicated to Zeus and featured eight pillars weighing 2,500 pounds each and arranged in an octagonal shape at the center of the stadium.  A procession of Greek athletes and Greek priestesses walk towards the pillars and simulate preparation for athletic competition. Each  manually adjustable cable of the eight pillars simultaneously hoists up an upper-perimeter of the large screen until the screen forms its upright 360° octagonal shape. Once hoisted, each of eight to sixteen actors/dancers located between the interior of the screen and a central 20,000 watt arc light casts a body-shadow or silhouette portraying an athlete or goddess, at times reaching nearly 50 feet in height. They strike the poses of the classic events of the ancient Olympics: archery, the discus, wrestling and running. The goddess of victory then appears to honor the champions.  The music used during this segment was called "The Tradition of the Games" composed by Basil Poledouris.  The segment ends with everything going dark signifying the end of the ancient Olympics.  Behind the scenes, workers remove the tarp from the track.

Parade of Nations

A tribute to Barron Pierre commences, his voice surrounds the stadium proclaiming the rebirth of the modern Olympics. Then there is a reprisal of the Call of the Nations. Once again the five Olympic spirits rise, this time calling for the rebirth of the modern games.

Then the stadium lights up and reveals the track and a stage where the temple was standing. One by one, runners representing the previous Olympics starting with Athens and continuing to Barcelona appear and run around the track. Following Barcelona is the Atlanta flag-barer. She is a woman and overtakes her fellow Olympics. She runs up a ramp in the northwest portion of the stadium and waves in celebrating before disappearing into the night. After a brief moment, the Greek delegation emerges marking the start of the Parade of Nations. Then 195 nations march in alphabetical order according to the English language. Nation 197, by tradition, is the host nation, and the United States enters last. Though not all athletes appeared at the opening ceremony, over 10,000 athletes were scheduled to partake in the competition.

Olympic Speeches, the Olympic Flag, and the symbolic release of Doves
Following the parade, ACOG President Billy Payne and IOC President Juan Antonio Samaranch delivered opening remarks welcoming everybody to the Games. Then U.S. President Bill Clinton opened the games by saying.

Then the Olympic flag made its entrance.  It was carried by 8 American Olympians from the past while the Atlanta Symphony Orchestra performed the tune "Simple Gifts."  Then the Olympic flag was raised while the Olympic Hymn was played by the Atlanta Symphony Orchestra and sung by the Centennial Olympic Choir.

Following the flag raising, 100 kids ran paper-maiche doves around the stadium symbolizing the peaceful gathering of athletes from across the world.  This was followed by a playing of portions of Atlanta native son, Dr. Martin Luther King Jr.'s I Have a Dream speech which he delivered in 1963 with a gospel choir.

Finally, Olympic heroes from the past were honored including Leon Štukelj who was then the oldest living gold medalist having earned his first gold in the 1924 Paris Olympics.

The Olympic flame and oaths
Al Oerter carried the torch to the stadium and was the last to hold the torch outside of the stadium.  He passed the torch to Evander Holyfield who ran with it through a network of tunnels and then made his appearance inside the stadium to a thunderous ovation on the stage in the middle of the field. Beethoven's Ninth Symphony (Ode to Joy) was played in the background. Holyfield ran with the torch down to the track and was joined by Greek athlete Voula Patoulidou. They both held the torch and made a lap around the track.  This symbolized the relationship between the first and current Olympic Games. The pair then passed the torch to American swimmer Janet Evans, the penultimate torchbearer, who carried it around a lap of the track and up a long ramp leading towards the northern end of the stadium. After more than 10,000 torch bearers, Muhammad Ali, who suffered from Parkinson's disease, dramatically lit the Olympic cauldron.

Then the oaths were given. US Basketball athlete Teresa Edwards gave the Athletes' Oath on behalf of all athletes.  Then diving official Hobie Billingsley delivered the officials' oath.

The Power of the Dream
Music completed the ceremony.  First up was the song "The Power of the Dream", composed by David Foster and performed in the opening ceremony by Céline Dion, accompanied by David Foster on piano, the Atlanta Symphony Orchestra and the Centennial Choir (Morehouse College Glee Club, Spelman College Glee Club and the Atlanta Symphony Orchestra Chorus).  The song became the unofficial anthem of the Atlanta games.  At the Closing Ceremony, the children of Atlanta performed the song as their farewell to the world.  To close the opening ceremony, Jessye Norman performed the song "Faster, Higher, Stronger."

Anthems
Both anthems were performed by the Atlanta Symphony Orchestra and the Centennial Olympic Choir.
 National Anthem of the United States
 Olympic Hymn

TV coverage

References

Opening Ceremony, 1996 Summer Olympics
Olympics opening ceremonies
Ceremonies in the United States